Michael Alan Rimmer (born 3 February 1986, in Southport) is an English middle-distance runner. He was born in Southport. Originally a member of Southport Waterloo AC, he changed clubs to rivals Liverpool Pembroke Sefton, who he still now races with. He also attended Christ The King catholic high school and broke numerous records in school mile races held at Victoria park, Southport. Michael was also a former sports scholar at Liverpool John Moores University.

Running career
He finished 8th in the 800m final at the 2006 European Athletics Championships in Gothenburg. Finished 2nd in his first European Cup in Munich (2007). He is the first male 800 m runner in British history to win national titles at under 15, 17, 20 and as a senior athlete.

His personal best is 1:43.89 (lowering his previous mark by over half a second) which he set in Rieti in 2010. This places him 6th on the "UK all time list" and is the fastest by any British athlete in over 17 years.

As he won the Senior title in 2008, he was selected to represent Team GB at the Beijing Olympics. Rimmer's build-up to the Games was disrupted by food poisoning, which he picked up at the holding camp in Macau. The Southport runner comfortably came through his first-ever Olympic race in 1:47.61, despite having lost almost  because of his illness.

In August 2009, Rimmer competed in the World Championships, held in Berlin. Rimmer looked promising throughout the heats of the 800 m, and after squeezing through his previous round he was well down the field in the semi-final in a time of 1:46.77. In July 2010, he became the first male 800 m runner in history to win five consecutive national senior titles in Birmingham. He won his first major championship medal in the European Championships in Barcelona, a silver medal behind Marcin Lewandowski with a 1:47.17.

Competition record

References

External links

 
 

1986 births
Living people
English male middle-distance runners
British male middle-distance runners
Olympic male middle-distance runners
Olympic athletes of Great Britain
Athletes (track and field) at the 2008 Summer Olympics
Athletes (track and field) at the 2012 Summer Olympics
Athletes (track and field) at the 2016 Summer Olympics
Commonwealth Games competitors for England
Athletes (track and field) at the 2014 Commonwealth Games
World Athletics Championships athletes for Great Britain
European Athletics Championships medalists
British Athletics Championships winners
AAA Championships winners
Black British sportsmen